Ikechukwu Obichukwu is a Nigerian Paralympic powerlifter. He represented Nigeria at the 2012 Summer Paralympics held in London, United Kingdom and he won the silver medal in the men's 52 kg event.

He also competed at the Commonwealth Games in 2010, where he won the bronze medal in the men's open bench press event, and in 2022 where he won a silver medal in the men's heavyweight event.

References

External links 
 

Living people
Year of birth missing (living people)
Place of birth missing (living people)
Powerlifters at the 2012 Summer Paralympics
Medalists at the 2012 Summer Paralympics
Paralympic silver medalists for Nigeria
Paralympic medalists in powerlifting
Paralympic powerlifters of Nigeria
Nigerian powerlifters
Powerlifters at the 2010 Commonwealth Games
Commonwealth Games medallists in weightlifting
Commonwealth Games bronze medallists for Nigeria
21st-century Nigerian people
Powerlifters at the 2022 Commonwealth Games
Commonwealth Games medallists in powerlifting
Commonwealth Games silver medallists for Nigeria
Medallists at the 2022 Commonwealth Games